Baron István Andrássy de Csíkszentkirály et Krasznahorka (1650 – 1720) was a Hungarian Kuruc general and nobleman, member of the old aristocrat Andrássy family. He was a supporter of Imre Thököly in the 1680s, later joined to Francis II Rákóczi in November 1703 during the Rákóczi's War for Independence. He became commander of the Kuruc armies in the areas between the Danube and Tisza (in Hungarian: Duna-Tisza köze).

Andrássy participated in the Battle of Győrvár on 6–7 June 1706. He became general of Lower Hungary in Autumn 1707. He capitulated before Imperial General Löffelholz during the Siege of Lőcse (today: Levoča, Slovakia) on 13 February 1710. After that he joined to the Austrian Army (became "Labanc"). He founded the family's betléri (de Betlér) branch and built the mansion in Betlér.

His younger brother was György Andrássy, also be a Kuruc general, founder of the monoki (de Monok) branch.

References

External links
 Hungarian Biographical Lexicon 

1650 births
1720 deaths
Hungarian nobility
Hungarian generals
Istvan